Raadhuisstraat is a street in Downtown Amsterdam, in the Netherlands. It is located between Nieuwezijds Voorburgwal and Prinsengracht. The street is named after the former City Hall or Town Hall, now the Royal Palace and it contains the gallery. It is the main thoroughfare into Old Centre.

Raadhuisstraat was built in 1895. Streets off of Raadhuisstraat are named after the many tanneries that used to be in the area. The street is noted for its shopping, a shopping area called the "Nine Streets," where vendors sell goods varying from handmade chocolates, high end personal goods and home decorum. A tramline was later introduced.

References

Streets in Amsterdam
Odonyms referring to a building